The Sacrament is a 2013 American found footage horror film written and directed by Ti West. A. J. Bowen and Joe Swanberg play VICE journalists who document their co-worker's (Kentucker Audley) attempt to locate his sister (Amy Seimetz) after she joins a reclusive religious commune. The film's plot is based on the real-life events of the Jonestown Massacre of 1978.

Plot 
Patrick, a fashion photographer, receives a letter from his sister, a recovering addict named Caroline, that invites him to visit Eden Parish, a utopian, drug-free community founded by a religious leader. When Patrick investigates, he discovers that they have moved to a secluded compound only accessible by helicopter, located in what Sam calls "a remote part of the world." Intrigued by the mystery, Patrick's co-workers, reporter Sam and cameraman Jake, suggest a feature documentary on the topic. The trip goes well, but the helicopter pilot warns them that he will leave with or without them the next day; they promise to be prompt. Issues first arise when they meet the guides at the airfield. Expecting only Patrick, the guides are taken aback by a film crew; they contact Father, the leader, who authorizes their entrance.

At the commune itself, armed guards delay the entry of the film crew. Feeling uneasy, Jake and Sam begin to regret the trip, but Patrick is able to smooth things over when his sister appears. Caroline enthusiastically welcomes them and apologizes for the misunderstanding. Caroline leaves with Patrick, and Jake and Sam are given their own cabin. After settling in, the two attempt to find members to interview. Several of the people open up to them and tell stories of how Father has saved them and given them new-found hope. The commune's nurse, Wendy, reveals that the commune has a well-stocked medical center funded by donations from the members, who sold off all their possessions.

Privately, the filmmakers express their skepticism but admit that the members seem happy and have accomplished much. Caroline arranges an interview with Father, and Sam prepares a list of questions. However, Father will only agree to do the interview during a public meeting. Father, an older Southerner, greets them warmly and at first answers the questions openly. However, his answers become more evasive and vaguely threatening. Near the end of the interview, Father raises the subject of Sam's pregnant wife, which Sam had mentioned earlier to Wendy. Put off-guard, Sam fumbles and loses control of the interview, and Father politely but dominantly cuts it short with roaring applause from his followers, who proceed to engage in a party.

During the party, Savannah, a young, mute girl, passes a note requesting help to Sam. When Sam and Jake attempt to locate Patrick, they find that he has been taken aside for a threesome, and an inebriated-seeming Caroline explains that they need Patrick's money. When the filmmakers search further, they discover a dissident group that wishes to leave, alleging abuse and brainwashing. Jake does not want to get involved, but Sam insists that they help despite the fact that the helicopter cannot fit them. Growing increasingly distrustful of Father and the commune, Jake and Sam anxiously wait out the night, unable to sleep.

In the morning, they find that the dissidents have become outright rebellious. Sarah, Savannah's mother, insists that they at least rescue her daughter, and Jake returns to the helicopter to delay its take-off. The pilot flatly refuses to help, but gunshots cut the conversation short. Jake flees into the forest and circles back to the helicopter; the injured pilot tells him to get the others. At the camp, Sam attempts to break up a fight, and a guard attacks him. Caroline angrily denounces him, and he is taken hostage. Father convenes the commune and forces everyone to take cyanide-laced drinks. Anyone who refuses is shot dead. Patrick, held hostage nearby, panics when Caroline injects him with a syringe, and she holds him as he dies.

When Jake returns to the camp, he finds almost everyone dead except for roving, armed guards. In a cabin, he finds Savannah and Sarah hiding; Sarah herself kills her daughter to spare her from execution, and a guard kills Sarah while Jake hides. When Jake finds Caroline, she refuses to leave the camp, saying that she has nothing left, and she self-immolates. When Jake finally confronts Father himself, he finds Sam bound to a chair. Father commits suicide, and the two filmmakers flee back to the helicopter, where they escape.

Cast 
 Joe Swanberg as Jake, Sam's cameraman
 A. J. Bowen as Sam, a reporter for Vice
 Kentucker Audley as Patrick, a fashion photographer and Caroline's brother
 Amy Seimetz as Caroline, an addict who joins the commune
 Gene Jones as Father, a.k.a. Charles Anderson Reed, the leader of Eden Parish
 Donna Biscoe as Wendy, the commune's nurse
 Kate Lyn Sheil as Sarah White, a loyalist, originally from Melbourne
 Shirley Jones Byrd as Lorraine, an elderly woman
 Talia Dobbins as Savannah, a mute child
 Kate Forbes as Mindy
 Lashuan Clay as Robert, a young man from a violent neighborhood
 Dale Neal as Andre, Robert's younger brother
 Conphidance as Guide #1, who works for "Father" and does everything as he is told

Production 
Eli Roth signed on to produce the film in September 2012. He described the film as "West's first mainstream movie". Swanberg, Bowen, Audley, Seimetz, and Jones were announced to have joined the cast in October 2012, as it went into production. The parts were written specifically for the actors, as Roth gave West full creative control. Swanberg doubled as cameraman for parts of the film, as West trusted his background as a filmmaker to shoot the scenes without supervision. West described the film as his most horrific film yet, and said that he wanted the film's violence to be upsetting. When West cast Jones as cult leader Father, he wanted to make sure that Father seemed like a genuine, well-meaning person who nonetheless was driven to evil by his paranoia. The film was shot outside of Savannah, Georgia.

Release 
The Sacrament premiered at the Venice Film Festival in September 2013. It was released on video on-demand on May 1, 2014, and had a limited theatrical release on June 6, 2014. It was released on home video on August 19, 2014.

Reception 
Rotten Tomatoes reports that 64% of 70 surveyed critics gave the film a positive review, with an average rating was 5.86/10. The consensus reads: "While it may be a bit too slow for some, The Sacrament offers enough tense atmosphere and intriguing ideas to satisfy discerning horror buffs." Metacritic rated it 49/100 based on 21 reviews.

Guy Lodge of Variety gave a mostly-positive review, commenting that making the cameraman of the found footage feature an employee of Vice magazine helped "[provide] an alibi for Eric Robbins' fluid, generously-lit lensing; most films in the found-footage genre have no reason to look this good." David Rooney of The Hollywood Reporter called it "a bone-chilling genre piece" that may disappoint horror purists. Robert Abele of the Los Angeles Times called the first half a "dread-inducing tour de force" but wrote that the second half is a disappointment that adds no insight to the real-life tragedy. Jordan Hoffman of Film.com gave an unfavorable review overall, criticizing what he saw as an overly-slow story line.

References

External links

2013 horror films
2013 horror thriller films
2013 films
American horror thriller films
Found footage films
Films about cults
Films about photojournalists
Films about suicide
Films directed by Ti West
Worldview Entertainment films
Religious horror films
Films produced by Eli Roth
Films scored by Tyler Bates
Films shot in Georgia (U.S. state)
Films set in 2013
Vice Media
Horror films based on actual events
Fratricide in fiction
Works about Jonestown
2010s English-language films
2010s American films